Dick Maloney (March 17, 1933 – August 19, 2010) was a Canadian jazz singer and radio host in Ottawa, Ontario, who performed for over forty years. In recognition for his achievements, the City of Ottawa named December 10, 1994, as Dick Maloney Day. He hosted the radio program, Sentimental Journey, on Oldies 1310.

Filmography:

'Miss Cast Away And The Island Girls'

References

External links
Official website

1933 births
2010 deaths
Canadian singer-songwriters
Musicians from Ottawa
Canadian jazz singers
Canadian radio personalities
Place of birth missing
20th-century Canadian male singers